LetsRun Park Busan–Gyeongnam, also known as Busan–Gyeongnam Horse Racing Park is the largest hippodrome in Gimhae and Busan, South Korea. It opened in 2005 and is operated by Korea Racing Authority (KRA).

Notable races

Popular culture 
LetsRun Park Busan–Gyeongnam was used as the main filming location in episode 126 of the South Korean variety show Running Man filmed in 2012.

References 

Horse racing venues in South Korea
Gangseo District, Busan
Gimhae